Slaves of Babylon is a 1953 American adventure film directed by William Castle and starring Richard Conte and Linda Christian

William Castle called it a "low budget extravaganza".

Plot
In 586 BC the city of Jerusalem was destroyed  by the armies of king Nebuchadnezzar and its people were brought captive into Babylon. After decades of subjugation by their Babylonian masters the Jews are crying out for a saviour. 
The prophet Daniel dispatches Nahum, one of his faithful servants, to search the faraway empire of Media for a young shepherd named Cyrus, who unknowingly is destined to become Cyrus, king of the Persians, who holds the key to the freedom of the Jewish people.

Cast
 Richard Conte as Nahum
 Linda Christian as Panthea
 Maurice Schwartz as Daniel
 Terence Kilburn as Cyrus
 Michael Ansara as Belshazzar
 Leslie Bradley as Nebuchadnezzar
 Ruth Storey as Rachel
 John Crawford as General Avil
 Ric Roman as Arrioch
 Robert Griffin as King Astyages
 Beatrice Maude as Cyrus' Foster Mother
 Wheaton Chambers as Cyrus' Foster Father
 Paul Purcell as Overseer
 Julie Newmar as Dancer-Assassin (as Julie Newmeyer)

Production
The film was announced by Katzman in November 1951. It was part of an eight-film slate he was making at Columbia, others including Prince of Pirates with Paul Henreid, Serpent of the Nile, Cairo to Suez, Jack McCall, Desperado, The Pathfinder, Siren of Bagdad and Flame of Calcutta.

In January 1952 the film was formally put on the schedule. It was part of the early 50s boom in Biblical era pictures. In May Kaztman said the film would start in November.

In July Richard Conte was announced as Nahum.

In October 1952 it was announced Richard Conte's wife Ruth would make her film debut in the movie under the name "Ruth Storey" and that Linda Christian would also appear. The same month Katzman said William Castle would direct following Conquest of Cochise.

References

External links

1953 films
1953 adventure films
American adventure films
Cultural depictions of Belshazzar
Cultural depictions of Cyrus the Great
Films directed by William Castle
Films set in Babylon
Columbia Pictures films
Films set in the 6th century BC
1950s English-language films
1950s American films